Carl Ulisses von Salis-Marschlins or Karl or Charles (28 September 1762 in Marschlins – 16 January 1818) was a Swiss naturalist interested in botany, entomology, and conchology.
He was a count of the Holy Roman Empire. His first studies were in Jena then at the Academy in Dijon. He was a Jurist. During the War of the Second Coalition he was held hostage in Salins-les-Bains 1799-1800 and later in St. Gallen (1801).

Aside from Natural Sciences von Salis was also interested in  agriculture, history and education and maintained contacts with researchers from abroad. He traveled often and wrote about his trip to Sicily and Naples in 1788-89. He described in detail the specifics of irrigation of the French Jura mountains.

He wrote Reisen in verscheidene Provinzen des Königreichs Neapel, Travels through various provinces of the Kingdom of Naples (Zürich & Leipzig, 1793), Beitrage zur natürliche und ökonomie Kenntniss des Königreichs beeder Sicilien, 1790 and Streifereyen durch den franzische Jura während den Jahren 1799 und 1800, 1805. He edited and wrote for three journals :Der Sammler (Collector), Der neue Sammler (New Collector) (1806-09) and Zeitschrift "Alpina".

Species described by von Salis include: Monoplex parthenopeus, Gibbula ardens, Patella tarentina, Conus jaspis and  Euphorbia gayi.
Johann Coaz honoured his name in Larix × marschlinsii Coaz (1917) - a hybrid name.

References
Historisches Lexicon der Schweiz

Swiss entomologists
Swiss malacologists
1762 births
1818 deaths
Swiss nobility
Romansh people
Cal Ullises